Averrhoidium is a genus of flowering plants belonging to the family Sapindaceae.

Its native range is Southern Mexico, Brazil to Paraguay.

Species:

Averrhoidium dalyi 
Averrhoidium gardnerianum 
Averrhoidium paraguaiense 
Averrhoidium spondioides

References

Sapindaceae
Sapindaceae genera